The governor of Formosa was the head of government during the Dutch colonial period in Taiwan, which lasted from 1624 to 1662. Appointed by the governor-general of the Dutch East Indies in Batavia (modern-day Jakarta, Indonesia), the governor of Formosa was empowered to legislate, collect taxes, wage war and declare peace on behalf of the Dutch East India Company (VOC) and therefore by extension the Dutch state.

The governor's residence was in Fort Zeelandia on Tayouan.

List of governors
There were a total of twelve governors during the Dutch colonial era. The man sometimes claimed as the thirteenth, Harmen Klenck van Odessen, was appointed by VOC Governor-General Joan Maetsuycker only to arrive off the coast of Tayouan during the Siege of Fort Zeelandia. Klenck refused to go ashore to take up his post despite being urged to by Frederick Coyett, the incumbent governor, and finally left without ever setting foot on Formosa.

See also
Dutch Formosa
Governor-General of Taiwan (1895–1945)
Governor of Taiwan Province (1994–present)

References

Dutch Formosa
Dutch East India Company
G
1624 establishments in Dutch Formosa
1662 disestablishments in Dutch Formosa